(born 21 January 1986 in Osaka, Japan) is a Japanese rugby union player. His preferred position is hooker although he can also play in the back row. He represents Japan at the international level. He has played for the Panasonic Wild Knights in the domestic Japanese Top League competition, and in 2013 began playing Super Rugby with the Melbourne Rebels in Australia, but has since gone back to Japan to play for the Sunwolves.

Japan
Horie made his debut for Japan in 2009, and represented his country at the 2011 Rugby World Cup.

Early years
Horie is a native of Osaka Prefecture. He began playing rugby when he was a fifth-grade student, and later captained the Teikyo University rugby team.

Top League 
Horie played for the Panasonic Wild Knights. He was named MVP for the 2015–16 Top League Season.

Super Rugby
In 2012, Horie played for Japan, and in New Zealand for Otago in the National Provincial Championship, where he attracted the attention of the Melbourne Rebels recruiting staff. In November 2012, the Rebels announced Horie's signing to play Super Rugby in Australia. In 2013 he became the first Japanese player to play for an Australian Super Rugby side often on the reserves bench.

Super Rugby statistics

References

External links
Shota Horie Player Profile Melbourne Rebels
 itsrugby.co.uk profile

1986 births
Japanese rugby union players
Living people
Japan international rugby union players
Saitama Wild Knights players
Otago rugby union players
Melbourne Rebels players
Rugby union hookers
Sportspeople from Osaka Prefecture
People from Suita
Japanese expatriate rugby union players
Expatriate rugby union players in New Zealand
Expatriate rugby union players in Australia
Japanese expatriate sportspeople in New Zealand
Japanese expatriate sportspeople in Australia
Sunwolves players